Kukherd (also Romanized as Kūkherd, Kookherd, and Kuhkhird; also known as Chāleh Kūkherd) is a city and capital of Kukherd District, in Bastak County, Hormozgan Province, Iran. At the 2016 census, its population was 4,450, in 1,196 families.

Kukherd was traditionally part of the region of Larestan. Kukherd's inhabitants are Larestani people.

Location and geography 
Kukherd is a district (Bakhsh بخش) located on the south western side of Iran in the Hormozgān Province, 155 kilometers south of the city of Lar and 45 kilometers from the city of Bastak. The Mehran river flows through its northern parts.
A chain of mountains extends about 55 kilometers from east to west  in northern parts of Kukherd forming a natural barrier that separates Koohkerd from other villages. One of the tallest mountains in Kukherd is Nakh (ناخ) rising about 800–900 meters above sea level. This mountain chain also includes the highest peak, the  Paletir (پلتير) mountain (1022 meters), and دسكDask (1380 meters).

History and etymology 
Kukherd civilization is ancient, going back more than 2000 years.  Evidence of the ancient archeology includes monuments that have been found dating to the Sassanid dynasty. This is in addition to having old tombs and having its unique architecture like the Windcatcher Bâdgir بادگیر 
Kukherd in Persian consists originally of two old Persian words: “koy كوي” and “kherd”. خرد
In the لغت نامه Loghatnaameh Dictionary , “koy” means alive and "kherd" means reason which can be translated to "The land of reason".

Historical sites 
Among ancient monuments that have been found in Kukherd are: 
Terenah:, (terenah ترنه )  the unique ancient methods of ancient Kukherd population have been using to transfer the sweet water from Mehran salty river to the other bank of the river order to water their lands
The Castle of Siba which has been maintained until  1163–1192. It was destroyed by an earthquake in Kukherd city, and was affected by the flood in 1367, which destroyed the remainder of the castle.
Another monument is for the  bazar of Siba.
The Castle of Aamaj.
The Castle of Tawseelah  in Geri zamerdan valey.
 The Historic Bath of Siba – An ancient bath house that is believed dated back to the Sassanid dynasty.
Islamic Monuments: Qiblah Mosque : مسجد جامع قبلة this mosque goes back to the ninth hijra century

Kukherd in the Cambridge History of Iran 
An early reference to Kukherd is dated to 1649, this is found in the Cambridge History of Iran, 
Volume 6th:

Went north from Kung through  Kuhkird, Bastak and Nimar, where it joined the 
main route at Lar, From the lesser Ports at Bandar Rig and Bandar Rishahr routes 
converged near Burazgan and the road to Shiraz Passed through Dalaki, Kazarun 
and the Dasht_i Arjan, These routes Were subject to extraordinary variations 
in climatic conditions, scorching heat when only traveling at night was 
bearable and Perishing cold  when travel might be impossible, An English factor, 
Robert Loftus, noted in April 1628, I stayed in Digerdoo” Dihgirdu” six daies 
until….

See also 

Larestan
Lar, Iran
Evaz
Bastak
Bandar Lengeh
Hormozgān
Maghoh
AL madani
Morbagh
The Historic Bath of Siba

References

External links 
  Kookherd Website.
  Shah Ismaail of Iran Britannica.com
  كوخرد در لغتنامه دهخدا

Cities in Hormozgan Province
Kukherd District
Populated places in Bastak County